Braemar  is a village in Aberdeenshire, Scotland, around  west of Aberdeen in the Highlands.

The Gaelic Bràigh Mhàrr properly refers to the area of upper Marr (as it literally means), i.e. the area of Marr to the west of Aboyne, the village itself being Castleton of Braemar (Baile a' Chaisteil). The village used to be known as Cinn Drochaid (bridge end); Baile a' Chaisteil referred to only the part of the village on the east bank of the river, the part on the west bank being known as Ach an Droighinn (thorn field).

Geography
Braemar is approached from the South on the A93 from Glen Clunie and the Cairnwell Pass and from the East also on the A93 from Deeside. Braemar can be approached on foot from the West through Glen Tilt, Glen Feshie, Glen Dee (by the Lairig Ghru), and Glen Derry (by the Lairig an Laoigh). Braemar is within a one-and-a-half-hour drive of Aberdeen, Dundee, and Perth.

The village is overlooked (from roughly northwest) by Carn na Drochaide (818 m), (from roughly northeast) by Creag Choinneach (538 m), (from roughly southwest) by Carn na Sgliat (690 m), and (from roughly southwest) by Morrone (859 m).

Climate

Like most of the United Kingdom, Braemar experiences an oceanic climate though somewhat cooler than lowland areas, verging on a subpolar oceanic climate. This record is shared with Altnaharra in the Scottish Highlands.
Braemar has an average of 102 days of air frost and 153 days with 1 mm or more of rainfall.
The very next day it was again the coldest and warmest place in the UK. Braemar recorded  later that month, meaning that for the second month in a row, Braemar recorded the warmest and coldest monthly temperatures for the UK. It was the lowest February temperature since 1955 and the UK's coldest night since 30 December 1995.

History
The modern village sits over the Clunie Water, a strategically important crossing on the Elsick Mounth, an ancient trackway used by Picts and Romans. It is located in the upper end of the historical Earldom of Mar, literally the Braes o' Mar. The Scottish Gaelic name Bràigh Mhàrr or upland of Mar was originally applied to the general area; using Braemar for the village dates to around 1870.

Before the 11th century, there were separate hamlets on each bank of the Clunie, Auchendryne on the west and Castleton on the east, or Bail Chasteil. The names are clearly marked on the current Ordnance Survey maps, below 'Braemar'. 'Castleton' refers to Kindrochit Castle, located within the modern village, rather than Braemar Castle to the south, while Kindrochit means 'bridge end'.  Kindrochit (or Kindrochit-Alian) was known as Doldauha before the mid-9th century.

According to legend, Malcolm III came to the area in around 1059, and built a timber bridge connecting the east and west banks. 'Kindrochit' means bridge end and the castle is assumed to have been built to protect the crossing. The ruins are considered to be largely of 14th-century origin, replacing the presumed timber-construction of the original castle.

Following the accession of George I in 1714, the Earl of Mar launched the 1715 Jacobite Rising on 6 September at Braemar. In 1795, a Roman Catholic chapel was built on the high-ground to the west of Auchendryne, giving the name to Chapel Brae, which was used as a school.

Until the 20th century, Braemar was largely owned by one of the adjoining Mar Estates, with Auchendryne and Invercauld on one side, Castleton on the other. Allegedly, inter-estate rivalry was a factor in each having its own pub, the Fife Arms Hotel in Auchendryne, and the Invercauld Arms Hotel in Castleton, built over the mound where the Earl of Mar raised the Jacobite standard in 1715.

Auchindryne (to use the spelling by Wyness) from ach' an droighinn (field of the thorn) belonged to a branch of the Farquharsons until it was forfeited in the aftermath of the Jacobite rising of 1745. Later that century it was acquired by William Duff, 1st Earl Fife.

The Catholic Church in Braemar is dedicated to Saint Andrew and was built in 1839. Catholicism has traditionally been strong in the Braemar area, and the bones of Saint Andrew rested in Braemar before being taken to the place now known as St Andrews.  St Ninian's Chapel, Braemar, completed in 1898, is the Scottish Episcopal Church place of worship.

Johann von Lamont (1805–1879), the Scottish-German astronomer and astrophysicist who pioneered the study of the Earth's magnetic field was born in nearby Corriemulzie.

On 16 March 2022, the 19th-century Braemar Lodge Hotel was engulfed in a fire and explosion.

Language
In the 1891 census, 59.2% of the population of Braemar spoke the Gaelic language "habitually"; the percentage of those actually able to speak the language (despite not having much opportunity to) would have been somewhat higher. The small crofting township of Inverey (Inbhir Èidh) was 86.3% Gaelic-speaking, most non-speakers being originally from Lower Deeside. The Gaelic spoken in the Aberdeenshire Highlands shared most features in common with the Gaelic of Strathspey and East Perthshire. The last native-speaker of the local Gaelic dialect died in 1984, though there are still surviving native-speakers of the similar Strathspey dialect.
At the 2001 census, out of a total population of 839 in Crathie and Braemar Civil Parish, only 5 (0.6%) claimed to be Gaelic-speakers.

Braemar Gathering
Known colloquially as The Games and originating from those believed to have been held by Malcolm III, an annual Highland Games Gathering is held at Braemar on the first Saturday in September and is traditionally attended by the British Royal Family.

In 1746, the Act of Proscription stopped all clan gatherings, but following its repeal in 1782, the old enthusiasms for such events returned. In 1815, the Braemar Highland Society was created and officially constituted in 1817; the first modern-day games taking place in 1832 with cash prizes being awarded to the competitors, using the funds of the Braemar Highland Society. On 14 September 1848 Queen Victoria attended the Gathering at Invercauld. In 1866, Royal was added to Braemar Highland Society and in 1906, the Duke of Fife presented  of Mar Estate to the Society and The Princess Royal and Duke of Fife Memorial Park, the current home of the Braemar Gathering, was created.

Since Queen Victoria's time, the reigning monarch has been the patron of the Braemar Royal Highland Society.

Amenities

Braemar has a golf course, two large hotels (Fife Arms and Invercauld Arms) as well as many smaller hotels and private homes offering bed and breakfast-style accommodation and a large SYHA hostel. On the southern edge of the village there is also a caravan site.  Braemar also has a small Post Office/village shop and mountain bike hire.

The Morrone Birkwood Nature Reserve is a nature reserve on the edge of the village reached from the car park at the top of Chapel Brae.

Transportation 
There is a regular bus service between Braemar and Aberdeen.

See also
 Allanaquoich
 Braemar Castle
 Cairnwell Pass
 Glen Lui
 Inverey
 Linn of Dee
 Mar Lodge
 Mar Lodge Estate
 St Ninian's Chapel

Notes and references

External links

  Braemar information guide for visitors
 Official Braemar Gathering Website

Villages in Aberdeenshire
Places and place names on Mar Lodge Estate
Buildings and structures on Mar Lodge Estate